The planning for the future of the Royal Air Force involves supporting ongoing British military operations, the introduction of new aircraft types including unmanned aerial vehicles, greater focus on network enabled capability and increasing interoperability with members of NATO, team tempest, and mixed crewed fighters. From the updated plans of the RAF (2021) state that the new initiative will focus on becoming carbon net-zero, with strategies such as using sustainable aviation fuels in aircraft. The RAF also are looking into investing in the maintenance of the aircraft to ensure success of future operations.

Combat Air

F-35 Lightning II

The Lockheed Martin F-35 Lightning II is a family of single-seat, single-engine, fifth generation multirole fighters under development to perform ground attack, reconnaissance, and air defence missions with stealth capability. It was selected for the UK's Joint Combat Aircraft requirement in 2001, having been selected initially to replace the Royal Navy's BAE Sea Harrier fighter, and latterly the existing Panavia Tornado GR.4 and Harrier GR.9  fleets (the latter already having been retired in late 2010), operating principally from the Queen Elizabeth-class aircraft carriers. It will be the main component of the RAF's manned strike capability, and marks the return of a carrier-borne strike capability for the Fleet Air Arm for the first time in nearly a decade.

The version initially selected was the Short Take Off Vertical Landing (STOVL) variant of the F-35, known as the F-35B. However, on 19 October 2010, David Cameron announced that the UK would change their order to the F-35C CATOBAR carrier variant for both the RAF and Navy. The F-35C variant features larger wings with folding wingtips and larger wing and tail control surfaces for improved low-speed control. This gives it a greater range and the ability to carry a larger and more diverse payload than the F-35B.

In May 2012, it was announced that the government had reverted to the previous plan to operate the STOVL F-35B, due to rising estimated shipbuilding costs associated with the CATOBAR variant F-35C, and an earlier estimated in-service date for the F-35B.

The delivery of the UK's first F-35B was made on 19 July 2012 at Fort Worth, Texas, for flight trials by the RAF and Royal Navy.

In 2015, the government's Strategic Defence and Security Review stated that the Government planned to order 138 F-35s, with 24 of them to be available for carrier duties by 2023. However, the 2021 defence white paper cut that number to only "more than 48" with the First Sea Lord stating that the objective would be to increase the order to 60 initially and then "maybe more up to around 80". It was hoped that 4 deployable squadrons (combined RAF and Royal Navy) might still be formed. On 10 January 2019, initial operating capability for the UK's F-35B was announced. The UK is committed to improving its F-35Bs to Block 4 standard, however, the actual number of improved jets is yet to be known. In April 2022, the Deputy Chief of Defence Staff, Air Marshal Richard Knighton, told the House of Commons Defence Select Committee that the MoD was in discussions to purchase a second tranche of 26 F-35B fighters. Plans for frontline F-35B squadrons envisage a total of three frontline (RAF and RN) squadrons each deploying 12-16 aircraft. At least one F-35B squadron is envisaged as part of the Fleet Air Arm in the Royal Navy. In surge conditions 24 F-35s might be deployed on one of the Queen Elizabeth-class carriers, but a routine deployment would likely involve 12 aircraft.

A report in September 2022 indicated that three additional aircraft are expected to be delivered in 2022 (delivery took place in November 2022), seven in 2023, four in 2024 and seven in 2025, completing the delivery of the planned 48 tranche 1 (one of which was lost in 2021). 

However, as of the end of 2022, U.K. Defence Secretary Ben Wallace reported that the RAF and Royal Navy faced a considerable challenge in  providing even the existing modest F-35B fleet with qualified pilots. As of late 2022 there were only 30 qualified British pilots (plus three exchange pilots from the United States and Australia) for the F-35. The average wait time for RAF trainee Typhoon and F-35 pilots, after completing the Military Flying Training System, was approximately 11 and 12 months respectively. A further gap of 68 weeks existed between completing Basic Flying Training and beginning Advanced Fast Jet Training.

Current and future units
No. 617 Squadron RAF, RAF Marham 
(One additional squadron)

Operational Conversion Units
No. 207 Squadron RAF, RAF Marham

Operational Evaluation Units
No. 17(R) Squadron RAF, Edwards Air Force Base

Typhoon

It was indicated in the 2015 Strategic Defence and Security Review that the RAF would retain its Tranche 1 Typhoons and use them to stand up an additional two squadrons. It was also announced that the aircraft would remain in service until 2040, ten years longer than previously planned. However, the 2021 defence white paper subsequently announced that the Tranche 1 Typhoons would instead be withdrawn from service by 2025. For the Typhoons remaining in service, the Government also promised to invest further in Typhoon air-to-ground capabilities and in a new active electronically scanned array (AESA) radar, as well as completing integration of the Storm Shadow and Brimstone missiles with the Typhoon. 107 Tranche 2 and 3 Typhoons will be equipped via "Project Centurion", allowing them to launch Meteor missiles, Brimstone and Storm Shadow missiles.

Frontline Units as of 2021
1(F) Squadron, RAF Lossiemouth
2(AC) Squadron, RAF Lossiemouth
3(F) Squadron, RAF Coningsby
6 Squadron, RAF Lossiemouth
IX(B) Squadron, RAF Lossiemouth
XI Squadron, RAF Coningsby
12 Squadron, RAF Coningsby
1435 Flight, RAF Mount Pleasant
Operational Conversion Units
29 Squadron, RAF Coningsby
Operational Evaluation Units
41 Squadron, RAF Coningsby

Combat Air Strategy and Team Tempest

At the 2018 Farnborough Airshow, UK Defence Secretary Gavin Williamson announced Team Tempest, a joint program office consisting of government divisions alongside BAE Systems, Leonardo S.p.A., MBDA and Rolls-Royce would be developing a new design of fighter aircraft with £2 billion STG (US$2.6 billion) in funding, by 2025. This will develop new technologies and means of production under the Future Combat Air System Technology Initiative (FCAS TI). It is likely to involve technology from Italy and Sweden using Gripen E, and is also likely to leverage on the UK's Typhoon experience.

Intelligence, surveillance, target acquisition, and reconnaissance

Wedgetail

In 2018, the RAF announced plans to upgrade its airborne early warning facility. Initially this was planned as an upgrade of the E-3D Sentry fleet, which would mirror the Sentry Block 40/45 upgrade undertaken by the USAF, and subsequently fitted to the Sentry fleet of the Armée de l'Air in France. However, owing to the significant cost of such a project, estimated at approximately £2 billion, it was thought that it would be more cost-effective to procure a new system instead. Although there were calls for an open competition to select the new platform, most notably from a partnership between Airbus and Saab, which would feature the Swedish company's Erieye radar system combined with an Airbus aircraft, the Ministry of Defence was announced as being in talks with Boeing over procuring its E-7 Wedgetail aircraft. To this end, in August 2018 the RAF began sending personnel to Australia to undergo training on the E-7, which was already in service with the RAAF. The potential selection of the E-7 was seen as advantageous in part due to its level of commonality with the P-8 Poseidon, which the RAF had selected as its new maritime patrol aircraft, as well as enabling greater co-operation with the RAAF. In October 2018, Gavin Williamson, announced that the Government had begun negotiations with Boeing, having determined that the E-7 "represents the best value for money option for the UK against need". A deal was signed in March 2019 that will see the RAF procure five E-7 aircraft for approximately £1.5bn. However, the 2021 defence white paper cut the total number of aircraft to only three. These will be based at RAF Lossiemouth alongside the Boeing P-8 Poseidon, and were initially due to enter service in 2023. With the E-3 Sentry having been withdrawn in 2021, this will leave a two-year capability gap that will see the United Kingdom rely on the NATO Airborne Early Warning and Control Force until the E-7 is operational. As of late 2022, the in-service date for the aircraft had been delayed to 2024.

Current and Future Units
8 Squadron, RAF Waddington

Transport and air-to-air refuelling

Atlas

22 Airbus A400M Atlas aircraft are being procured to replace the Lockheed Hercules C4/C5 (C-130J) aircraft which will be withdrawn from service by 2023.

The A400M will increase the airlift capacity and range compared with the aircraft it was originally set to replace; the older versions of the Hercules and Transall. Cargo capacity is expected to double over existing aircraft, both in payload and volume, and range is increased substantially as well. The cargo box is 17.71 m long excluding ramp, 4.00 m wide, and 3.85 m high. The height is 4.00 m aft of the wing and the ramp is 5.40 m long. The Airbus A400M will operate in many configurations including cargo transport, troop transport, Medical evacuation, and electronic surveillance. The aircraft is intended for use on short, soft landing strips and for long-range, cargo transport flights.

Current and future units
70 Squadron, RAF Brize Norton
30 Squadron, RAF Brize Norton (expected to be the second operational squadron following retirement of part of the Hercules fleet)
Operational Conversion Units
24 Squadron, RAF Brize Norton
Operational Evaluation Units
206 Squadron, RAF Brize Norton

Envoy IV

In September 2021, it was announced that the four BAe 146 aircraft operated by No. 32 Squadron primarily in the Command Support Air Transport role would be withdrawn by the end of March 2022. In February 2022, it was announced they would be replaced by a pair of Dassault Falcon 900LX. The aircraft would be known as the Envoy IV and would initially be operated under a joint civilian / military operation. The aircraft will receive a package of defensive systems and military communications for use by RAF personnel, but will be civilian registered for two years up to 2024, with civilian flight crews, during which period RAF crews would be trained, with a view to the aircraft subsequently being transferred to the military register after 2024 and operated wholly by military crews.

Current and Future Units
No. 32 (The Royal) Squadron RAF, RAF Northolt

Helicopters

New Medium Helicopter 

New Medium Helicopter (NMH) is a programme to procure a new medium-lift support helicopter to replace the RAF's Puma HC2 and three other helicopter types operated by the British Army. It is expected the 36-44 new aircraft will enter service during the mid-2020s.

Unmanned Aerial Vehicles

Protector RG1
The Protector programme (formerly known as Scavenger) will supply a next-generation medium-altitude, long-endurance (MALE) UAV to replace the current General Atomics MQ-9 Reaper UAVs.

In June 2011, BAE Systems and Dassault Aviation announced they would collaborate on an aircraft called Telemos. However, the project was effectively abandoned in 2012 after Dassault pursued a collaboration with EADS Cassidian and Alenia Aermacchi instead.

In October 2015, the Prime Minister, David Cameron, announced the purchase of more than 20 Protector UAVs which would be delivered by the end of the decade. This was confirmed in the 2015 Strategic Defence and Security Review. As of mid-2018, the in-service date had slipped to 2024. The exact platform selected for Protector was not disclosed, but in February 2016, General Atomics Aeronautical Systems claimed that it would be a Certifiable Predator B. The Ministry of Defence later confirmed that it would be an enhanced variant of Predator B, designed to be compatible with NATO airworthiness standards, and that it would also come with the extended wing and fuel tanks of the ER (Extended Range) version, giving an increased endurance of over 40 hours. In April 2016, the Ministry of Defence confirmed it would seek to acquire the Certifiable Predator B through a Foreign Military Sales contract with the U.S. Department of Defense. It was indicated that at least 16 UAVs would be purchased with a maximum of up to 26. In July 2018, it was announced that this aircraft will be designated "Protector RG Mark 1" (RG1) in RAF service, and is to be delivered in 2024 when it will replace Reaper. A contract was signed on 11 September 2019 to test the RPAS' limit and report on its performance. In July 2020, the Ministry of Defence signed a contract for three Protector UAVs with an option on an additional thirteen aircraft. The 2021 defence white paper indicated that the total number of UAVs ordered would in fact be limited to 16. In July 2021, an order was placed for the 13 additional Protector UAVs.

According to MBDA, the Royal Air Force intends to arm the aircraft with Brimstone missiles and Raytheon UK Paveway IV precision-guided bombs.

Future Units
31 Squadron (1st Protector RG1 Operational Squadron will reform at RAF Waddington)
13 Squadron (current MQ-9A Reaper Squadron, will convert to MQ-9B at RAF Waddington)
39 Squadron (current MQ-9A Reaper Squadron at Creech AFB (NV, USA), will reform and convert to MQ-9B at RAF Waddington)

Operational Conversion Unit
54 Squadron

Test & Evaluation Unit
56 Squadron

Swarming Drones
On 11 February 2019, Secretary of State for Defence Gavin Williamson announced that the UK will develop 'swarming drones' to defeat enemy air defences. A IHS Janes report stated that the RAF will form a new squadron to specifically control these drones.

Current Units
216 Squadron, RAF Waddington

Lightweight Affordable Novel Combat Aircraft programme

The RAF's Rapid Capabilities Office is aiming for a technology demonstrator, named "Mosquito", for which contracts were placed with Blue Bear Systems Research Ltd, Boeing Defence UK Ltd, and Callen-Lenz (Team BLACKDAWN partnered with Bombardier Belfast and Northrop Grumman UK Ltd). This project is aiming for adding unnamed capabilities to future jet aircraft.

Future Combat Air System (FCAS)

The Future Combat Air System (FCAS) aimed to deliver an unmanned combat aerial vehicle (UCAV) by 2030. FCAS will be built in co-operation with France, utilising technology from the BAE Taranis and Dassault nEUROn technology demonstrators. Development of full-scale prototypes was expected to begin by 2017. In the Royal Air Force, FCAS will be expected to operate alongside Typhoons and F-35 Lightning IIs.

As a UCAV, FCAS will utilise stealth technology to reduce its radar cross-section (its radar signature is reportedly the size of a dragonfly). It will feature a high degree of autonomy, enabling it to complete a large part of its missions without human control. It will have a 16-metre (50 ft) wingspan and two internal weapon bays.

According to Bernard Gray of the Ministry of Defence, technology from FCAS could also be incorporated onto a manned platform. Other officials have also insisted that a manned option for FCAS has not been ruled out. According to a House of Commons Defence Select Committee (DSC) report, a new "clean-sheet" manned fighter design has not been ruled out, nor has the option to buy further or upgrade existing aircraft.

Space operations
The Secretary of State for Defence, Penny Mordaunt, announced at the Air & Space Power Conference on 17 July 2019 that a Team Artemis, a joint US-UK team will be formed to launch and research small military satellites and "launch a small satellite constellation within a year". It was announced  separately that No. 23 Squadron RAF would reform as Britain's first "space squadron responsible for day-to-day space command-and-control, including the flying of satellites".

In November 2020, the Prime Minister announced the formation of a Space Command.

Future Units
23 Squadron

Training

In February 2021, the RAF's Rapid Capabilities Office (RCO) signed an agreement with the aviation start-up company Aeralis to further develop the Aeralis Advanced Jet Trainer as a potential replacement for the RAF's Hawk training aircraft.

Missiles
 The 2015 Strategic Defence and Security Review announced further investment into the Storm Shadow and Brimstone missiles.
 In March 2016, the Ministry of Defence extended the assessment phase contract for the Select Precision Effects At Range (SPEAR 3) missile programme, which aims to deliver a "mini-cruise missile" capable of attacking stationary and moving targets.
 At the 2019 Chief of the Air Staff's Air & Space Power Conference (ASPC), it was announced that the RAF and MOD are pursuing Mach 5 air-to-air weapons capability or hypersonic missiles carried by Fourth-generation jet fighters, Fifth-generation jet fighters and Sixth-generation jet fighters.

Countermeasures
In September 2016, an initial £2.5m batch order for the British-developed BriteCloud DRFM jammer was placed with Leonardo-Finmeccanica. If trials of the system prove successful, it could begin to be fitted to the Royal Air Force's fast-jet fleet by mid-2017.

See also
Army 2020 Refine
Future of the Royal Navy
List of active United Kingdom military aircraft

Notes

References

Royal Air Force
Military planning